Aglaja  is a genus of sea slugs, marine opisthobranch gastropod mollusks in the family Aglajidae. The genus is found in all warm and temperate oceans.

Species
The following species Are recognized:
 Aglaja berrieri (Dieuzeide, 1935)
 Aglaja ceylonica Bergh, 1900
 Aglaja laurentiana (R. B. Watson, 1897)
 Aglaja minuta Pruvot-Fol, 1953
 Aglaja ocelligera (Bergh, 1894)
 Aglaja tricolorata Renier, 1807
 Aglaja unsa Ev. Marcus & Er. Marcus, 1969
Synonyms
 Aglaja bakeri MacFarland, 1924: synonym of Navanax inermis (J. G. Cooper, 1862)
 Aglaja cyanea (E. von Martens, 1879): synonym of Philinopsis speciosa Pease, 1860
 Aglaja depicta Renier, 1807: synonym of Philinopsis depicta (Renier, 1807)
 Aglaja dubia O'Donoghue, 1929: synonym of Philinopsis dubia (O'Donoghue, 1929) (original combination)
 Aglaja ezoensis Baba, 1957: synonym of Melanochlamys ezoensis (Baba, 1957) (original combination)
 Aglaja felis Er. Marcus & Ev. Marcus, 1970: synonym of Nakamigawaia felis (Er. Marcus & Ev. Marcus, 1970) (original combination)
 Aglaja gemmata (Mörch, 1863): synonym of Navanax gemmatus (Mörch, 1863)
 Aglaja gigliolii Tapparone Canefri, 1874: synonym of Philinopsis speciosa Pease, 1860
 Aglaja henri Burn, 1969: synonym of Melanochlamys queritor (Burn, 1957)
 Aglaja hummelincki Er. Marcus & Ev. Marcus, 1970: synonym of Camachoaglaja berolina (Er. Marcus & Ev. Marcus, 1970)
 Aglaja iwasai Hirase, 1936: synonym of Philinopsis speciosa Pease, 1860
 Aglaja lineolata H. Adams & A. Adams, 1854: synonym of Tubulophilinopsis lineolata (H. Adams & A. Adams, 1854) (original combination)
 Aglaja lorrainae Rudman, 1968: synonym of Melanochlamys lorrainae (Rudman, 1968) (original combination)
 Aglaja maderensis (R. B. Watson, 1897): synonym of Melanochlamys maderensis (R. B. Watson, 1897)
 Aglaja nana Steinberg & Jones, 1960: synonym of Melanochlamys diomedea (Bergh, 1894)
 Aglaja nuttalli Pilsbry, 1895: synonym of Philinopsis nuttalli (Pilsbry, 1895) (original combination)
 Aglaja orbignyana (Rochebrune, 1881): synonym of Navanax orbignyanus (Rochebrune, 1881)
 Aglaja orientalis Baba, 1949: synonym of Spinoaglaja orientalis (Baba, 1949) (original combination)
 Aglaja pelsuncq Ev. Marcus & Er. Marcus, 1966: synonym of Philinopsis depicta (Renier, 1807)
 Aglaja phaeoreticulata Yonow, 1990: synonym of Tubulophilinopsis reticulata (Eliot, 1903)
 Aglaja pilsbryi (Eliot, 1900): synonym of Tubulophilinopsis pilsbryi (Eliot, 1900)
 Aglaja pusa Ev. Marcus & Er. Marcus, 1966: synonym of Philinopsis pusa (Ev. Marcus & Er. Marcus, 1966) (original combination)
 Aglaja queritor Burn, 1957: synonym of Melanochlamys queritor (Burn, 1957) (original combination)
 Aglaja quinza Ev. Marcus, 1979: synonym of Philinopsis quinza (Ev. Marcus, 1979) (original combination)
 Aglaja regiscorona Bertsch, 1972: synonym of Niparaya regiscorona (Bertsch, 1972) (original combination)
 Aglaja splendida Marcus, 1965: synonym of Tubulophilinopsis gardineri (Eliot, 1903)
 Aglaja taila Marcus Ev. & Er., 1966: synonym of Aglaja tricolorata Renier, 1807 (junior synonym)
 Aglaja taronga Allan, 1933: synonym of Philinopsis taronga (Allan, 1933) (original combination)
 Aglaja troubridgensis Verco, 1909: synonym of Philinopsis troubridgensis (Verco, 1909) (original combination)
 Aglaja virgo Rudman, 1968: synonym of Melanochlamys virgo (Rudman, 1968): synonym of Philinopsis virgo (Rudman, 1968) (original combination)

References

Further reading
 Renier, S.A. (1807). Tavole per servire alla classificazione e conoscenza degli animali, [1] + pl. I-VIII. Note: work placed on the Official Index of Rejected and Invalid Works in Zoological Nomenclature by ICZN Opinion 427 (1956). Padova (Tipografia del Seminario)
 Vaught, K.C. (1989). A classification of the living Mollusca. American Malacologists: Melbourne, FL (USA). . XII, 195 pp.

External links
 Meckel J.F. (1809). Ueber ein neues Geschlecht der Gasteropoden. In: Beyträge zur vergleichenden Anatomie. Heinrich Reclam, Leipzig, 1(2): 14-33
 Zamora-Silva A. & Malaquias M.A.E. (2018 [nomenclatural availability: 2017). Molecular phylogeny of the Aglajidae head-shield sea slugs (Heterobranchia: Cephalaspidea): new evolutionary lineages revealed and proposal of a new classification. Zoological Journal of the Linnean Society. 183(1): 1-51]

Aglajidae
Gastropod genera